Franz Niklaus König (1765–1832) was a Swiss painter of genre art and portraits.

After studying under Tiberius and Marquard Wocher, Sigmund Freudenberger and Balthasar Anton Dunker, he made a name for himself through dress pictures, rural genre scenes and landscapes. He found success with his Diaphanies, which were exhibited in Switzerland, Germany and France, and were seen by Johann Heinrich Meyer and Goethe. in 1797 moved he and his family into the Bernese Oberland and in 1798 he took over as captain of artillery in the battle against the French invasion of Switzerland. He was a participant in the Unspunnenfest celebrations of 1805 and 1808.

References
 

18th-century Swiss painters
18th-century Swiss male artists
Swiss male painters
19th-century Swiss painters
1765 births
1832 deaths
19th-century Swiss male artists